The 2008–09 Bundesliga was the 46th season of the Bundesliga, Germany's premier football league. The season began on 15 August 2008 with a 2–2 draw between defending champions Bayern Munich and Hamburger SV and ended with the last matches on 23 May 2009. VfL Wolfsburg secured their first national title in the last match after a 5–1 win at home against Werder Bremen.

Changes from 2007–08

Structural changes
Starting with the 2008–09 season, two-legged relegation playoffs between the third last team of the Bundesliga and the third team of the 2. Bundesliga at the end of the regular season were re-introduced.

Due to the restructuring of European competitions, the third-placed team qualified for the 2009–10 UEFA Champions League, entering in a separate qualifying round for non-champions. The fourth-placed team and the winner of the 2008–09 DFB-Pokal qualified for the 2009–10 UEFA Europa League play-off round; the fifth-placed team qualified for the third qualifying round. The sixth-placed team did not qualify for any European competitions because the UEFA Intertoto Cup will not be continued after its final edition in 2008.

Promotion and relegation
1. FC Nürnberg, Hansa Rostock and MSV Duisburg finished the 2007–08 season in 16th through 18th place, respectively, and therefore were relegated to the 2. Bundesliga. They were replaced by the top three teams of 2007–08 2. Bundesliga: Borussia Mönchengladbach, 1899 Hoffenheim and 1. FC Köln, respectively.

Teams

Stadia and locations

Notes
 1899 Hoffenheim played their 2008 home matches at Carl-Benz-Stadion in Mannheim because their Rhein-Neckar-Arena had not yet been completed.
 Bayer Leverkusen played their 2009 home matches at LTU-Arena in Düsseldorf because their BayArena was being upgraded to a capacity of 30,000.

Personnel and sponsoring

Notes
 Jupp Heynckes acted as caretaker for the remainder of the season.
 Mike Büskens, Youri Mulder and Oliver Reck acted as caretakers for the remainder of the season.
Ein Herz Für Kinder took the place of Volkswagen's sponsorship during the 2008–09 season to celebrate the 20th year of the Charity.

Managerial changes

League table

Results

Relegation play-offs
Energie Cottbus, as the 16th-placed team, faced third-placed 2. Bundesliga team 1. FC Nürnberg for a two-legged playoff. Nürnberg won both matches on an aggregated score of 5–0 and thus secured promotion to the 2009–10 Bundesliga, while Cottbus were relegated to the 2009–10 2. Bundesliga.

After Energie were relegated, no teams from the former East Germany played in the Bundesliga until RB Leipzig earned promotion to the Bundesliga for 2016–17.

Statistics

Top goalscorers
Source: kicker.de

Awards

Player of the Month

Champion squad

References

External links
 Official site  
 Bundesliga on DFB page 

Bundesliga seasons
1
Germany